Sainte-Colombe-de-Peyre is a former commune in the Lozère department in southern France. On January 1, 2017, it was merged into the new commune of Peyre-en-Aubrac. Its population was 188 in 2019.

See also
Communes of the Lozère department

References

Saintecolombedepeyre